The Commercial Bank of Ethiopia Headquarters is a skyscraper in Addis Ababa, Ethiopia that was completed on 13 February 2022 and became the tallest building in Ethiopia. It serves as the headquarters of the state-owned Commercial Bank of Ethiopia, the country's largest bank. It also is the tallest building in all of East Africa.

History
Construction commenced in 2015 under a  deal with the China State Construction Engineering Corporation. The foundation stone was laid on 27 June 2015. The building was then topped out in the second half of 2019. Cladding work however has been delayed due to the foreign currency shortage in Ethiopia that made it harder for local businesses to fund imports, thus, affected the bank's financial as it still controlled most of the country's banking activities in 2020.

The building was originally scheduled to be completed on 19 January 2019. As of August 2018, construction of the building is scheduled to be completed in 2020.

In February 2022, the building was officially inaugurated to coincide with the 80th anniversary of the Commercial Bank of Ethiopia.

Site
The building site is an 18,000 meter plot on Ras Desta Damtew Road in Addis Ababa.

Design
The building will be 198 meters tall with 52 stories, two 5-story podiums, and 20-metre deep underground parking lots. The building design includes 46 above-ground floors, a mezzanine level, a ground floor, and 4 basement levels. The building will have 150,000 square meters of floor area.

Its design includes eight conference halls, an emergency waiting room for disasters, two restaurants on the top two floors, and a sightseeing tower.

It will be the tallest building in Ethiopia upon completion.

See also
 List of tallest buildings in Africa

References

Commercial buildings in Ethiopia
Buildings and structures in Addis Ababa